The Trofeo Mamma & Papà Guerciotti is a cyclo-cross race held in Milan, Italy, which was part of the UCI Cyclo-cross World Cup.

Past winners

References
 Men's results
 Women's results

UCI Cyclo-cross World Cup
Cyclo-cross races
Cycle races in Italy
Recurring sporting events established in 1978
1978 establishments in Italy